Robert Jerry "Ben" Williams (September 1, 1954 – May 18, 2020) was an American professional football player who was a defensive lineman in the National Football League (NFL) between 1976 and 1985.  He was selected by the Buffalo Bills in the third round of the 1976 NFL Draft out of the University of Mississippi. He was named to the Pro Bowl in 1982. Williams was the first African-American football player at Ole Miss.

Life and career
Williams was the first Black person to play in a football game at Ole Miss. Nicknamed "Gentle” Ben Williams, during his college days, he was a three-time All-SEC selection. He currently holds the school record for career (37) and single season (18) sacks. 

In 1976, he became the first Black player from Ole Miss to be drafted by the NFL. He selected by the Buffalo Bills in the third round. During his ten years with the Bills he made 45.5 sacks, a franchise record.

On November 24, 2022 when Ole Miss played against Mississippi State in the Egg Bowl, Williams became the second Black player and only the fourth overall to have his number retired at Ole Miss. The others are Archie Manning, Chucky Mullins, and Eli Manning.

References

1954 births
2020 deaths
American football defensive ends
Buffalo Bills players
Ole Miss Rebels football players
American Conference Pro Bowl players
People from Yazoo City, Mississippi
Players of American football from Mississippi